Southern Pacific Railroad Depot in Whittier, California is a train depot built in 1892 that is being preserved by the City of Whittier to house a railroad museum and community center. The depot is a rectangular two-story, wood-frame building. The station agent lived in the second floor apartment.

In the 1890s the growth of Whittier caused the Southern Pacific Railroad to build a branch line from its main line in Santa Fe Springs, California. The depot was originally built at 11825 Bailey Street.  The branch served local citrus packing houses and a gas works. In the early 1900s, the Pacific Electric Railway built a branch line that paralleled the Southern Pacific track.

With the arrival of the automobile, passenger traffic on the Pacific Electric decreased, and in 1938 the Pacific Electric ceased service to Whittier.  The Southern Pacific then abandoned its tracks and took over the Pacific Electric tracks and extended them to the station.  The Southern Pacific continued providing freight train service to Whittier until 1967. From 1967 until the mid-1980s, the Southern Pacific Depot was occupied by various industrial tenants.

On July 1, 1978 the depot was first listed in the National Register of Historic Places.  In the mid-1980s, plans began to develop for the restoration and preservation of the depot. The City took possession of the depot and after several years of neglect, the City received a $1.2 million grant to restore and reuse the depot.  The depot was ultimately moved to 7333 Greenleaf Ave., near the Uptown Business District. Because of the move, the depot was removed from the National Register on October 1, 2004. The depot was subsequently relisted at its present location on March 29, 2005.

References

External links
 A Brief History of the Southern Pacific Railroad in Whittier
 Whittier Train Depot on the Move

Railway stations in Los Angeles County, California
Whittier, California
Railway stations on the National Register of Historic Places in California
Buildings and structures on the National Register of Historic Places in Los Angeles County, California
Railway stations in the United States opened in 1892
Stick-Eastlake architecture in California
Whittier
Railway stations closed in 1938